Atrusca trimaculosa, also known as the woollybear gall wasp, is a species of gall wasp. This wasp is found on a variety of oak trees, including valley oak, blue oak, and Oregon oak. Its galls are 3-4 mm wide, round, and covered in stiff hairs. The galls are located on leaves, and often clustered together. Only females of this species are known.

References

External links 

 Atrusca trimaculosa on gallformers

Cynipidae